Muncuqlu or Mundzhuglu or Muncuglu may refer to:
Muncuqlu, Azerbaijan
Mundzhuglu, Azerbaijan

See also
Muncel (disambiguation)